Dukpu is an ethnic group of the Central African Republic, Democratic Republic of Congo and Sudan. They speak Mid-Southern Banda, a Ubangian language. The number of persons in this group exceeds 100,000.

Ethnic groups in the Central African Republic
Ethnic groups in the Republic of the Congo
Ethnic groups in Sudan